Nicolai Weichel (born November 6, 1997) is a Danish ice hockey player for Nordsjælland Cobras and the Danish national team.

He participated at the 2017 IIHF World Championship.

References

External links

1997 births
Living people
Danish ice hockey defencemen
Nordsjælland Cobras players